Greatland Corporation is an employee-owned company that supplies preprinted and blank wage and income reporting forms, primarily W-2 and 1099 forms, to small- and mid-sized businesses and tax professionals. Greatland also supplies business checks and specialty forms.

It has locations in Grand Rapids, Michigan and Green Bay, Wisconsin.

Subsidiary holdings
Greatland has three subsidiary organizations:
 FileTaxes.com is an online wage reporting system for small businesses for e-filing and mailing recipient copies of 1099-MISC, 1099-INT, 1099-DIV, 1099-R, 1099-S and W-2 forms, as well as filing and payments associated with 941 and 944 filing.
 Nelco Solutions; based in Green Bay, Wisconsin, was acquired by Greatland in 1998.
 Broker Forms, specializes in 1099 & W-2 reporting.
 ImageOne, a provider of presentation materials, custom-created presentation supplies, and W-2 & 1099 products, was acquired by Greatland in 2005. In June 2011, the company dissolved the ImageOne brand and folded it in under its existing Greatland brand.

History
The firm was founded in 1974 by Robert Napieralski as Great Lakes Business Forms. The company was renamed Greatland Corporation in 1994.

It has 175 full and part-time employees divided between its sales and marketing offices at its Grand Rapids headquarters, and a printing, development and distribution operation in Green Bay. On September 26, 2006, Greatland became a 100% Employee-Owned (ESOP) company. Bob Nault is Greatland's CEO.

The company's 2009 revenue was $38 million.

In October 2019, it was reported that Greatland has acquired JAT Software Inc., a provider of year-end reporting software, web applications and print services for companies, in an undisclosed deal.

References

External links
Greatland Corporation Website

Taxation in the United States
Tax software of the United States
Accounting software
Business services companies established in 1974
Employee-owned companies of the United States
Companies based in Kent County, Michigan
Companies based in Grand Rapids, Michigan
Software companies established in 1974
1974 establishments in Michigan